Mount Pengelly is located on the border of Alberta and British Columbia on the Continental Divide. It was named in 1914:  Pengelly was the family name of the wife of A.J. Campbell, an assistant to A.O. Wheeler of the Interprovincial Boundary Survey.

See also
 List of peaks on the Alberta–British Columbia border
 Mountains of Alberta
 Mountains of British Columbia

References

Pengelly
Pengelly
Pengelly